Nona Lovell Brooks (March 22, 1861 – March 14, 1945), described as a "prophet of modern mystical Christianity", was a leader in the New Thought movement and a founder of the Church of Divine Science.

Biography
Brooks was born on March 22, 1861, in Louisville, Kentucky, the youngest daughter of Chauncey and Lavinia Brooks.   At a fairly early age, her family moved just outside Charleston, West Virginia, where Brooks graduated from the Charleston Female Academy. Due to the collapse of her father's  salt mining business, the family moved again, this time to Pueblo, Colorado, where he  entered the metal mining business. He died shortly after the move, when Brooks was 19.

In 1890, with the aim of becoming a teacher, Brooks enrolled at Pueblo Normal School, which was followed by a one-year stay at Wellesley College.

In 1887, encouraged by her sister, Althea Brooks Small, Nona Brooks attended classes taught by Kate Bingham, proponent of the New Thought philosophy. While attending these classes, Brooks "found herself healed of a persistent throat infection" and shortly thereafter Brooks and Small began to heal others.

Divine Science

In December 1898, Brooks was ordained by Malinda Cramer as a minister in the Church of Divine Science and founded the Denver Divine Science College. Shortly thereafter, she inaugurated the Divine Science Church of Denver, holding its initial service on January 1, 1899, at the Plymouth Hotel in Denver, in the process becoming the first woman pastor in Denver.

In 1902, Brooks founded Fulfillment, a Divine Science periodical. During this period, she also served on several Denver civic boards, including the Colorado State Prison Board.

After World War I Brooks succeeded her sister Fannie James as head of the college and in 1922 Brooks aligned the growing Church of Divine Science with the International New Thought Alliance.  In the early 1930s she moved to Australia, where she established several Divine Science organizations, returning to Chicago in 1935 and then back to Denver in 1938.

Nona L. Brooks died March 14, 1945, in Denver, Colorado, and is buried at Fairmount Cemetery (Denver, Colorado) with her family.

Nona was described by many who knew her as warm, gentle, and "motherly", but with "a strength that came from conviction".

Bibliography

Brooks was the author of:
Mysteries (1924)
The Prayer that Never Fails 
Short Lessons in Divine Science
What is Real and What Illusion?
The Training of Children: Based upon the Practical Principles of Life
Studies of Health
The Kingdom of Law.

Several of her sermons were collected in Into the Light of Healing.

References

Further reading

 Colorado Prison Association (1908) Biennial Report.
 Deane, Hazel (2006) Powerful is the Light, Kessinger Publishing, .
 First Divine Science Church of Denver, "Centennial", accessed May 2008.
 "Nona Lovell Brooks" in Encyclopedia of Occultism and Parapsychology, 5th ed. Gale Group, 2001. Reproduced in Biography Resource Center. Farmington Hills, Mich.: Gale, 2008., accessed May 2008
 "Nona Lovell Brooks" in Religious Leaders of America, 2nd ed. Gale Group, 1999. Reproduced in Biography Resource Center. Farmington Hills, Mich.: Gale, 2008., accessed May 2008.
 Satter, Beryl (2001) Each Mind a Kingdom: American Women, Sexual Purity, and the New Thought Movement, 1875-1920, University of California Press, .

1861 births
1945 deaths
Writers from Louisville, Kentucky
American religious writers
American Christian mystics
New Thought writers
Religious leaders from Louisville, Kentucky
Writers from Charleston, West Virginia
People from Pueblo, Colorado
Writers from Denver
New Thought mystics
Divine Science clergy
20th-century American writers
20th-century American women writers
20th-century Christian mystics
Women religious writers